Sŏngbul-sais a Korean Buddhist temple in Sariwŏn, North Hwanghae Province, North Korea. It is located within the castle on Mt. Jŏngbang and was founded in 898 AD. The temple consists of six buildings, some of which are among the oldest wooden buildings in North Korea.

 Kukrak Hall (극락전/). Rebuilt in 1374, this pavilion sits on a raised stone platform and features delicate paintings, cow-tongue eaves, and doors with carved flower grilles. A Koryo period five-story stone pagoda stands in front of it.
 Ungjin Hall (웅진전/). Rebuilt in 1327, Ungjin Shrine is one of the oldest wooden buildings in North Korea. The long, spacious hall sits on a raised platform, and is a paradigm of Koryo architecture.
 Myŏngbu Hall (명부전/)
 Chongpung Pavilion (청풍루/)
 Unha Hall (운하당/)
 Sansin Shrine (산신각/)

See also
Chongbang Fortress
Korean architecture
Korean Buddhism

References

Buildings and structures in North Hwanghae Province
Buddhist temples in North Korea
National Treasures of North Korea
9th-century establishments in Korea
9th-century Buddhist temples
Religious buildings and structures completed in 898